Mounaragam (transl. Silent Symphony) is a Malayalam language Indian television soap opera that airs on the entertainment channel Asianet and streams on Disney+ Hotstar. It is an official remake of the Telugu language serial Mouna Raagam, which airs on Star Maa.

Plot
Deepa and Prakashan are a married couple who live with Prakashan's mother. Deepa is a kind, caring woman, while Prakashan is a cruel man who finds girls to be a burden. Consequently, he ignores his daughter Kadhambari, his first-born, and longs for a son, with his mother backing his desire. Deepa becomes pregnant a second time, but Prakashan decides to kill the baby since he cannot afford another child. He poisons Deepa with the help of his mother. The child survives, but is born mute due to the effect of the poison. Prakashan and his mother are angry and dejected at the birth of a speech-deprived girl child. Prakashan consults an astrologer who predicts that the child will bring misfortune to the family. As a result, Prakashan and his mother mistreat the child, but Deepa and her brother (Dayanand) take care of her. They name the girl Kalyani. After this, Deepa again gives birth, this time to a baby boy, who is christened Vikramadhityan (aka Vikram). Prakashan and his mother are elated and pamper him, while continuing to hate Kalyani and sending her to work (selling milk) at a tender age.

Years later

Kalyani is now a young woman. Though mute, she is talented and intelligent, but still longs for her father's affection. When she was small, Kalyani had saved the life of a rich boy named Kiran. After a long gap, Kiran tries to find out who the girl was. He meets Kalyani and immediately likes her kind, calm nature. He decides to employ her as a cook in his construction company. Eventually they both fall for each other. Kiran then abandons his fiancée (and cousin) Sarayu. Kiran does not know that Kalyani is mute and thinks that she is on a Maun Vrat (a fast of silence). Kalyani decides to reveal the truth to him. Kiran is shocked, but ultimately forgives her and decides to encourage her to become confident and bold. Heartbroken that Kiran has left her, Sarayu becomes jealous of Kalyani and vows revenge on her. Sarayu's parents, Rahul and Shari, support her in this.

Kalyani's brother, Vikram, is a cunning, spoiled brat and falls for Sonia, a wealthy girl who is revealed to be Kiran's sister. Vikram discovers Sonia's wealthy status and attempts to make her fall in love with him, but fails. Vikram then discovers that Sonia is an art-lover. Since Vikram does not know how to draw, he requests Kalyani to draw a picture for Sonia. Kalyani does this without knowing the reason. Vikram gives the picture to Sonia and tells her that he drew it. Sonia is then attracted to Vikram and they grow close. Sonia becomes pregnant with Vikram's baby. When she tells this to Vikram, he rebuffs her. Sonia attempts suicide, only to be saved by Kalyani. Prakashan does not want this marriage to happen because Sonia's uncle, Rahul, is Prakashan's enemy. Rahul is also against this marriage due to his enmity towards Prakashan. So Prakashan demands that on the eve of the wedding day, Rahul must wash Prakashan's feet, or the marriage will not happen. This infuriates Rahul and he decides to kill Vikram, who is saved by Kiran. He protects Vikram from Rahul's goons for the sake of his sister. Rahul then plans to marry Sonia off to a meek man, Baiju, so that no one will question Rahul's authority. Kiran and Sonia object to this. Meanwhile Vikram is thought to be missing, which horrifies Prakashan. He tries his best to find him, but fails. Sonia and Baiju's marriage is fixed, and Kiran promises Sonia that he will bring Vikram to the ceremony. Indeed, Vikram arrives on time and marries Sonia, foiling Rahul's plan. Kiran and Sonia do not know yet that Vikram had pretended to know how to draw so that rich Sonia may fall for him. After marrying Sonia, Vikram manages to open an interior design department in Kiran's company, and keeps using fraudulent methods to conceal that he is not an artist.

Kiran introduces Sonia to Kalyani, and both girls get along well. Sonia supports Kalyani in facing her problems. In order to ruin Kalyani's life, Rahul, Vikram and Ratheesh (Kadhambari's husband) team up and hire Baiju to marry Kalyani, much to Kalyani's and Kiran's dismay. Prakashan accepts this marriage proposal, as he had always wanted Kalyani to be married off to any unsuitable groom. Prakashan had earlier been planning to marry her off to Rajappan, a loan shark who lent money to Prakashan. Sarayu and her mother, Shari, rejoice that Kiran would now marry Sarayu instead of Kalyani. Kiran and Sonia try their best to prevent Kalyani and Baiju's marriage from happening. Meanwhile, Kiran and Sonia's niece, Paru, enters Kalyani's life. She stands by Kalyani's and quarrels with people who pester Kalyani, which leads to hilarious events.

Paru taunts Prakashan by calling him Kaduva (tiger) and calls Prakashan's mother Moonga Muthassi (owl grandmother). She also hates Sarayu and calls her Ettukaali (spider). Paru expresses that she wishes Kalyani to marry Kiran, and helps to arrange their wedding in 'Thevar Kaavu'. But, in order to separate Kalyani from Kiran, Rahul reveals that Kalyani drew the pictures for Vikram and that Vikram is not an artist. Kiran becomes angry at Vikram and also at Kalyani. Kalyani and Kiran part ways, and the ceremony gets cancelled. Kalyani starts working at the company's construction site to avoid meeting Kiran. But Kiran soon realizes that Kalyani wasn't the real culprit and that Vikram duped her for his own benefit. Kiran tries to talk with Kalyani but she refuses, since Kiran's mother (Roopa) has told her to stay away from Kiran. On the other hand, Kiran quarrels with Vikram for betraying his sister but manages to keep it a secret from Sonia.

Kiran's love for Kalyani grows and he seeks ways to help her. He prohibits her from going to the construction site, as he could not see her working as a daily wage laborer. But Kalyani and her friend Lindaa misunderstand this, and Lindaa advises Kalyani to be stronger than before. Kalyani gets a job at a small restaurant, where she cooks food and helps the old lady owner. Kiran arranges for Kalyani to get a job as an interior designer in a reputed company called Sony Ray. Because of this, the interior design department of Vikram's company gets backlogged as Kalyani's company gets more work than Vikram's. Kalyani earns a good salary, buys a diamond necklace, and even gets a two-wheeler as gift from her company (which was actually gifted by Kiran). Kalyani's lifestyle changes much, but she still remembers Kiran though she never tries to meet him. Prakashan gets furious with her changed lifestyle and tries to torture her again, but she is bolder now with the support of Sonia and Paru. She is well-accepted by her co-workers and is loved by the staff because of her intelligence and kindness. Once Baiju comes to flirt with Kalyani. Enraged, she assaults him. Baiju realises that he cannot marry Kalyani and decides to treat her as a friend from then on.

Meanwhile, Shari and Rahul inform Roopa about Vikram's true colors. Shocked, Roopa faints and is rushed to the hospital where Rahul lies to her that Kalyani was drawing pictures to help Vikram trap Sonia. This intensifies Roopa's hostility towards Kalyani. Vikram is in a fix as his company is suffering loss and is shut down. He is obligated to celebrate Sonia's birthday by throwing a huge party, but he is in dire need of money. He approaches Sonia's family, who reject his request, while Kiran and Roopa taunt him. But Kalyani lends Prakashan money for the party via his friend, and this is revealed later in the party, due to which Prakashan storms out from the event. Meanwhile, Roopa decides to fix marriage between Kiran and Sarayu, but both Kalyani and Kiran are sad on knowing this. On the eve of the wedding, Sarayu gets chickenpox. In spite of this, Roopa tries to fix their marriage, without telling Kiran and Sonia about Sarayu's illness. On the other hand, Paru leaves for an important surgery and Roopa tells everything to Kalyani, who feels helpless. However, Kiran finds out the secret planning and asks Roopa about it, which ends in a heated argument. Kiran then storms out of his home and meets with an accident due to driving at a high speed. Roopa realizes her mistake. She agrees for marriage between Kalyani and Kiran, much to the dismay of Rahul, Shari, and mainly Sarayu. Sarayu puts up an act before Roopa and Kiran that she has changed and is ready to marry someone else. She shares her plan with her father and he contacts Raj Mohan, a criminal.  Kiran is excited to marry Kalyani, but is worried if Roopa would get to know about Kalyani's disability. Meanwhile Sarayu sends Anas to kill Kalyani.

Kiran reveals to Roopa that Kalyani was the one who had saved Kiran's life in the childhood incident. Roopa starts liking Kalyani even more. Roopa fixes their wedding and gives her ancestral ornaments to Kalyani as a gift. Shari is enraged and opposes the marriage. Even though angered by Roopa's actions, Rahul and Sarayu act nice in front of Roopa and Kiran and support the marriage. On the other hand, Prakashan becomes jealous as Kalyani is going to marry Kiran and argues with her. Rahul and Sarayu try to ruin Kalyani's marriage. Kiran arranges a job for Prakashan on Kalyani's request for which he gets rupees 1 lakh as advance, but Prakashan gets enraged when he sees Kalyani. The owner of the company files a complaint against him. Prakashan threatens revenge on Kalyani and Kiran.

Prakashan sneaks into Kiran's house and removes the brakes from his car. The next morning, as Kalyani and Kiran are about to go out of the house, Roopa stops them from entering the car, saying that the car is giving some problem and has to be taken for repair. After they leave, Roopa calls Vikram to take the car to the repair centre. Unfortunately, Vikram suffers a serious accident while driving the car. The doctor reveals to Prakashan that Vikram has lost his voice as the seat belt injured him. This infuriates Prakashan. He lashes out at Kiran, who is visiting Vikram at the hospital, and blames him for the accident. Meanwhile, the matter is unknown to the family and Kalyani suspects something is amiss. The truth is soon revealed, shattering all. Prakashan blames Kalyani for the accident and beats her up. An enraged Kiran blackmails Prakashan by showing him the footage of Prakashan sneaking into his house and removing the brakes. Prakashan begs Kiran not to reveal the truth. Kiran agrees on the condition that Prakashan be nice to Kalyani. Prakashan agrees to it, but has something else in mind.

Trying to divert Kalyani's mind from the unfortunate incident, Kiran arranges for her to travel to Kanyakumari for a project along with a staff member. Kiran plans a surprise for Kalyani by travelling to Kanyakumari along with Baiju and Paru. However, Sarayu finds out and hires an assassin to murder Kalyani. Kiran surprises Kalyani and organizes a party. Kiran gets a call from an anonymous number warning him that Kalyani's life is in danger. Scared and anxious, Kiran tries to protect Kalyani. However, the assassin enters Kalyani's room and tries to murder her, but Kiran and Baiju save her and beat up the assassin who reveals that Sarayu was behind all this. Kiran is shocked.

Later, Sonia enters labor and is rushed to the hospital by Kalyani and an unknown man, who is revealed to be Chandrasenan, Kiran's estranged father. Chandrasenan and Roopa had split due to some issues and Rahul had supposedly killed Chandrasenan, but he was rescued by people. Rahul and Shari are doubtful whether Chandrasenan is alive or not.Chandrasenan reveals the truth to about his real identity shocking Kalyani and decides not to reveal to the truth .  Sonia gives birth to a baby girl after Chandrasenan saves her by donating his blood. Prakashan does not accept the baby, but his mother has changed her ways and is happy with the child. Vikram pretends to be joyous and is loving towards the child. During the Noolukettu ceremony of the child, Roopa invites Chandrasenan, and Kiran and Sonia wish to invite Kalyani, but Roopa tells them not to because Sarayu had revealed to her that Kalyani is mute from birth. Roopa develops instant hate for her because of her disability and because she had lied to her about her silence-fasting. Kiran threatens Prakashan to invite Kalyani or he will show the footage to everyone. Prakashan agrees meekly and talks with Roopa.Then later Cs with an old man look comes along with Kalyani  to Nooluktu  ceremony .the Cs plans marriage for Kalyani

Kiran  and Sonia finds out about his real father and reunites with him . Even Baiju and Paru find Kiran's Father and they embrace him . One day Prakashan suggests that Kalyani should marry CS's son. Deepa resists his idea and he assaults her. CS incites Deepa against Prakashan's tyranny and she takes a bold stand in front of Prakashan. Eventually Roopa also comes up with the same idea, and CS agrees to a plan to get Kiran married to Kalyani instead. Kalyani , Kiran and Deepa also agrees to the plan. But they fear that if Roopa doesn't agree to the wedding. Roopa is elated and gifts Kalyani 101 gold sovereigns, much to Sarayu's dismay. Sarayu mixes the real jewelry with fake jewelry so that Deepa and Kalyani should get arrested if they ever try to mortgage it. Kiran becomes aware of her plan and switches the bags again so that Deepa gets the original one. Sarayu decides to mortgage the jewelry (which is actually fake) and gets arrested by the police. Roopa is angry at her for bringing shame upon the family repeatedly. Kiran and kalyani get engaged in presence of Chandrasenan and Deepa

Finally the wedding day dawns .Prakashan's family, Rahul, Shari and Roopa are happy that Kalyani is getting married to Cs's son . Kiran puts up an act that he is having chest pain to divert Roopa's attention because Cs's friend Sooryakumar is bridegroom in front of Roopa's family and  Chandrasenan is bridegroom in  front of Prakshan's Family and Roopa doesn't like to see Chandrasenan . When the marriage was about to start a stranger reveals that Kalayni's marriage got over  shocking everyone including Prakshan , Roopa , Rahul and Shari.Then Roopa questions Kiran about Kalyani's secret marriage and Kiran showing engagement ring shocking Roopa and falls unconscious and Shocking  Prakshan,Rahul and Shari. Chandrasenan manages to convince Roopa to agree to the wedding of Kiran-kalyani marriage and Roopa gives her consent making Kiran,Kalyani,Sonia,paru,Deepa and Baiju happy but angering Prakshan's family'Rahul and Shari .Finally  Kiran and Kalyani get married happily in front of Shwetha menon who is chief guest.

Sarayu tries to stall Kiran and Kalyani's nuptial night with several methods- like mixing soap in the milk meant to be drunk. However, they would always backfire on her.

Rahul decides to teach Kiran a lesson and reveals the relations between the latter and Chandrasenan to Roopa. She ousts the newlyweds from her house and breaks relations with them. Kiran and Kalyani decide to start their own business without any help from Chandrasenan or anyone.

Here enters Manohar, a gold digger who has fooled several girls into loving him. He makes an entry during a meeting in front of Sarayu- she falls for him and Rahul sends a proposal to Manohar, to which he agrees. Kiran and Baiju learn of Manohar's treachery and warn Sarayu about him. However she misunderstands him and claims that he is trying to destroy her life. When Manohar is tackled by kiran, he lashes out at Sarayu. Saryu badmouths Kalyani and Baiju slaps her for it. She files a complaint against Baiju and gets him arrested. However, CS bashes Rahul badly and forces Sarayu to withdraw the complaint. Prakashan takes over the company and makes Vikram the MD and Sarayu decides to teach Vikram a lesson by revealing his treachery to Sonia, who doesn't know anything yet. Meanwhile Kiran gets a new projrect with a rich man who lived in America named kuriyakose. They get to do the interior work. Meanwhile Sarayu is shocked by knowing that Kiran and Kalyani gets the interior work of there construction project. Kiran realizes that Manhor is also cheating kuriyakose daughter named Dona. Kiran warns Manohar to not marry Dona as she is a nice person. He also tells him that if you want you can marry Sarayu because of all the bad deeds she has done. He tells Dona about Manohar cheating her and Dona decides to go and ask Manohar. As if somehow he got out of that case he prevented them from doing the interior work. Meanwhile Sarayu is very happy in Kiran losing the project and brings new interior people. As she was about to introduce, kuriyakose denys them and gives the work to Kiran and Kalayani. 
Sarayu gets very mad in kurriyakose and Dona for giving the work back to kiran. Sarayu's almost took all the work that Kiran got before this interior work and was expecting this to go to them as well but it didn't work out. As time goes by Kiran and Kalyani gets a new house for rent, Roopa refuses to go to the house warming. Soni,CS (Kiran and Soni's father) Deepa, Hari (The supervisor of Kiran's company), Baiju and Paru participate sin the function. Onam comes in after a few months Kiran, Kalyani and CS goes to the textiles to get dresses for Onam, 3 of them were selecting dresses for each other and CS was selecting one for Roopa and wanted to give it to her. And suddenly Soni and Roopa comes into the same shop to get Onam dresses as well. They quickly hide so that Roopa doesn't see them. CS wants to give the saree he selected for Roopa. Kiran call's Soni. Soni quicly quickly goes to Kiran without Roopa knowing. She comes back and gives the saree to Roopa by saying that she selected it for her. Roopa loves that saree and selctes it for Onam. Kiran and Kalyani celebrates Onam with Soni, Paru, Baiju and CS. Rahul decides to reveal that Soni also has relation with CS (So that Sarayu gets all the money and the charge of company) by taking videos of their Onam celebration. But his plan fails while showing the video of the Onam celebration CS wasn't there . CS aleardy knew that he was aleardy taking the video of the celebration and removed his picture from it. Meanwhile Kiran and Kalyani plans a trip to Munnar they had a lovely time. They shared the pictures with Paru who showed to Prakshan and shared with Sarayu. Sarayu got really mad with this and decided to kill Kiran and Kalyani by sending people. Without knowing this Kiran and Kalyani got hurt and was sent to the doctor's. By luck they were saved. Roopa went to see Kiran and Kalyani at the hospital secretly. and looked through the window of their room. For revenge CS planned to kill Sarayu but didn't do it. Meanawhile Manhor is in a dilemma beacause the wedding between Sarayu and Manhor, and the Mamodisa (a celebration before wedding in christianity) between Dona and Manohar was on the same day. Sarayu is all ready to go to the wedding hall while Manohar is scared and nervous.

Cast

Main Cast 
 Aishwarya Ramsai as Kalyani Kiran: a mute girl, Prakash and Deepa's daughter, Kadambari and Vikram's sister, Kiran's wife.
 Naleef Gea as Kiran Chandrasenan: Chandrasenan and Roopa's son, Sonia's brother, Sarayu's cousin. Kalyani's husband.
 Balaji Sarma as Prakashan: Kalyani, Kadambari and Vikram's father, Deepa's husband who hates Kalyani.
Firosh as Chandrasenan/CS: Roopa's husband, Kiran and Soni's father, MD of Sony Ray group of companies
 Avani Nair (episodes 1–71) / Shrishwetha Mahalakshmi (Episode 72–present) as Sonia Vikramadityan a.k.a. Soni: Kiran's younger sister, Vikram's wife.
 Darshana Das (episodes 1–205) / Madhusri (episodes 205–299) / Pratheeksha G. Pradeep (Episode 300– 685) / Darshana Das ( Episode 686- present) as Sarayu: Kiran's cousin who wants to marry him, Rahul and Shari's daughter, Kiran and Soniya's cousin.

Recurring cast 
 Padmini Jagadeesh (episodes 1–240) / Sabitha Nair (episodes 241–present) as Deepa: Prakash's wife, Kalyani, Vikram and Kadambari's mother
 Sona Jelina as Parukkutty, Kiran's and Sonia's niece, daughter of DYSP Dineshan and supports Kalyani and wants Kiran to marry Kalyani 
 Kalyan Khanna as Vikramadithyan a.k.a. Vikram: Kalyani and Kadambari's younger brother, Prakashan and Deepa's son and Soniya's love interest-turned-husband who tricked Sonia by telling that he is an artist
 Sabu Varghese as Rahul: Kiran and Soniya's uncle, Sarayu's father and Roopa's brother and wants to separate Kiran and Kalyani and wants Kiran to marry Sarayu and inherit the wealth of Roopa
 Arun Mohan as Ratheeshan: Kadambari's husband who lusts after Kalyani
 Sethu Lakshmi as Bhanumathi: Prakashan's mother, Deepa's mother-in-law, Kalyani, Kadambari and Vikram's grandmother who hates Kalyani 
 Saritha Balakrishnan (episodes 1–194) / Beena Antony (Episode 195–present) as Shari Rahul: Rahul's wife, Sarayu's mother, Kiran and Soniya's aunt
Anjo Nair as Roopa: Kiran and Sonia's mother, Rahul's sister and Sarayu's aunt who likes Kalyani but doesn't like her going after Kiran but now hates Kalyani after knowing that Vikram can't draw
Anjusree Bhadran / Shari Krishnan as Kadambari Ratheesan: Kalyani and Vikram's elder sister and Ratheesan's wife
Aagneya as charuletha:soni and Vikram's daughter 
Karthik Prasad as Baiju: A mentally challenged youth who dreams of marrying Kalyani. Later, he supports Kalyani.
Jithu Venugopal as Manohar
Mini Sreekumar as Yamini: Domestic help of Roopa
Swathi Thara as Daisy: Sarayu's friend
Sreekala as Thattukada owner: An old woman who offered Kalyani a job. She supports Kalyani
Kottayam Rasheed as Dayanandan, Deepa's brother
Jose K George as Xavier
Asha Nair as Xavier's wife
Thamburu as Linda: Kalyani's best friend 
Baby Parthavi as Young Kalyani
Thirumala Ramachandran as Balan, Prakashan's friend
Reshma R Nair as Dona
Manohar's. Girlfriend 
Aseena Yousuf as kalyanii's friend
 Dr. D Kris venugopal as Kuriakose
 Leading business man and best friend of CS
Dayandan as CS's assistant
_ as Vrinda
 Neighbour of Kiran ,Kalyan , manohar & sarayu

Guest appearances
Meera Vasudevan as Sumithra (episodes 145–147)
Saikiran Ram as Mohan Kumar (episodes 179–182)
Gauri P. Krishnan as Anumol (episodes 179–182)
Chef Suresh Pillai as Cookery show judge (Onam episode 2021)
Sreethu Krishnan as Herself (episodes 548-550)
Noobin Johny as Himself (episodes 548-550)
Reshma Nair as Herself (episodes 548-550)
Manisha Mahesh as Herself (episodes 548-550)
Sandra Babu as Herself (episodes 548-550)
Avanthika Mohan as Herself (episodes 548-550)
Shweta Menon as Herself (episodes 557-562)

Adaptations

References

Asianet (TV channel) original programming
Malayalam-language television shows
2019 Indian television series debuts